The Division of Banks is an Australian electoral division in the state of New South Wales.

History

The division was created in 1949 and is named for Sir Joseph Banks, the British naturalist and botanist who accompanied James Cook on his voyage to Australia in 1770. It has always been based in the south-western and southern suburbs of Sydney, including the suburbs of Padstow, Panania, Peakhurst and Revesby.

Up until 2013, it was held since its creation by the Australian Labor Party, but has grown increasingly marginal from the 1990s onward. It was almost lost in 2004, but the 2006 redistribution added areas to the west in Bankstown and Condell Park which strengthened the seat for Labor. Those areas were lost in the 2009 redistribution, which pushed Banks into new areas to the east, around Hurstville. Long-term Labor member, Daryl Melham, was defeated at the 2013 federal election by current member David Coleman. Coleman became the first non-Labor member for the seat, breaking a 64-year tradition.

Boundaries
Since 1984, federal electoral division boundaries in Australia have been determined at redistributions by a redistribution committee appointed by the Australian Electoral Commission. Redistributions occur for the boundaries of divisions in a particular state, and they occur every seven years, or sooner if a state's representation entitlement changes or when divisions of a state are malapportioned.

The division includes the suburbs of Allawah, East Hills, Hurstville Grove, Lugarno, Mortdale, Oatley, Padstow, Padstow Heights, Panania, Peakhurst, Peakhurst Heights, Picnic Point, Revesby Heights, and South Hurstville; and parts of Bankstown, Bankstown Aerodrome, Beverly Hills, Blakehurst, Carlton, Condell Park, Connells Point, Hurstville, Milperra, Narwee, Penshurst, Revesby, and Riverwood.

Members

Election results

References

External links
 Division of Banks - Australian Electoral Commission

Electoral divisions of Australia
Constituencies established in 1949
1949 establishments in Australia